Dilwale Kabhi Na Hare is a 1992 Indian Hindi-language film directed by V. N. Menon and produced by Babubhai Thiba. It stars Rahul Roy, Prithvi, Nagma, And Varsha Usgaonkar in pivotal roles.

Plot
Rahul and Vijay becomes friends, after both of them saves each other getting framed in the murder case. Problems arise when they found out that they are in love with the same girl, Anjali. Rahul decides to sacrifice his love, while Vijay has something else in his mind.

Cast
Rahul Roy ... Rahul
Prithvi ... Vijay
Nagma ... Anjali Oberoi
Varsha Usgaonkar ... Shabnam
Satish Shah ... Gene
Girja Shankar ... D. K. Oberoi 
Gajendra Chouhan ... Shibu
Rakesh Bedi ... Pandit Aladdin Jagat Mama
Guddi Maruti ... Chintin
Dinesh Anand ... Inspector

Soundtrack
The soundtrack of the movie was composed by the music duo Nadeem Shravan. The lyrics were written by Mahendra Dehlvi. The album became a  hit and the songs "Hum Pyar Karte Hain", "Tu Meri Hai" and "Dilwale Kabhi Na Hare" were very popular. Most of the songs were sung by Kumar Sanu and  Alka Yagnik, along with Shabbir Kumar, Nitin Mukesh and Rajeshwari.

Background score by Pallav Pandya.

References

External links

1990s Hindi-language films
1992 films
Films scored by Nadeem–Shravan